SpaceX CRS-2, also known as SpX-2, was the fourth flight for SpaceX's uncrewed Dragon cargo spacecraft, the fifth and final flight for the company's two-stage Falcon 9 v1.0 launch vehicle, and the second SpaceX operational mission contracted to NASA under a Commercial Resupply Services (CRS-1) contract.

The launch occurred on 1 March 2013. A minor technical issue on the Dragon spacecraft involving the RCS thruster pods occurred upon reaching orbit, but it was recoverable. The vehicle was released from the station on 26 March 2013, at 10:56 UTC and splashed down in the Pacific Ocean at 16:34 UTC.

History 

The planned shipment of the Falcon 9 first stage from Texas to the Florida launch site was delayed due to the ongoing investigation of the engine failure that occurred on the previous flight. In late November 2012, it was reported that the CRS-2 Falcon 9 had been transported to Cape Canaveral (CCAFS). A static fire test occurred for the CRS-2 Falcon 9 on 25 February 2013.

Firsts 
The Dragon unpressurized trunk section, which allows the transport of unpressurized cargo to the ISS, had its first use on this flight. This cargo consisted of two Heat Rejection Subsystem Grapple Fixtures (HRSGFs), which are essentially bars to be attached to the ISS radiators to allow for future movement work.

Payload 

The Dragon returned  of cargo,  without packaging.

Dragon thruster pods anomaly 
Shortly after second stage separation, at 15:45 UTC on 1 March 2013, the Dragon spacecraft encountered technical problems involving its propulsion system. "When priming its four Draco Thruster Pods, the vehicle detected insufficient pressurization on the oxidizer (Nitrogen Tetroxide) system" of three of the pods which "caused the Flight Computers to place the vehicle in Passive Abort Mode". In this mode, Dragon is not executing any more orbital operations. Its thruster system was disabled and the solar panels were not deployed since the vehicle had not achieved its proper solar panels deployment attitude. "Dragon is programmed not to open its solar panels outside its proper attitude configuration to avoid contact with the second stage. This rule is in place for scenarios in which Dragon is not properly separated from the Falcon 9 booster. As time progressed, teams working at SpaceX Mission Control, MCC-X in Hawthorne, California, started assessments of the issue". During the early minutes and hours of the mission, the mission progress news came in bits, some of it over social media. An update from Elon Musk on Twitter clarified:

Issue with Dragon thruster pods. System inhibiting three of four from initializing. About to command inhibit override.

At 16:12 UTC, Elon Musk announced that a "command inhibit override" would be issued as the Dragon module was "about to pass over Australia ground station". Initially solar panels deployment was held "until at least two thruster pods are active". SpaceX Mission Control decided to proceed with solar deployment due to array temperatures while the spacecraft was not in active attitude control at 16:40 UTC: "Thruster pod 3 tank pressure trending positive. Preparing to deploy solar arrays". At 16:50 UTC, solar arrays had successfully been deployed on the Dragon spacecraft. Three of the four thruster pods on the Dragon spacecraft must be operational for berthing to be allowed with the International Space Station. After making corrections, SpaceX regained control of all four thruster pods and would be able to correct its course to the ISS. According to Elon Musk, "All systems green". NASA officials said that the spacecraft would not rendezvous with the ISS on 2 March 2013 as was originally planned. It would instead rendezvous on 3 March 2013. Dragon was grappled with Canadarm2 by NASA Expedition 34 commander Kevin Ford and NASA flight engineer Tom Marshburn at 10:31 UTC on 3 March 2013, and was berthed to the nadir (Earth-facing) docking port of the Harmony module at 13:56 UTC.

Remainder of mission (3 to 26 March 2013) 

On 6 March 2013, the space station's Canadarm2 removed the grapple bars from Dragon's trunk. This event marked the first delivery of unpressurized cargo from a commercial spacecraft to the ISS. The spacecraft's return to Earth was postponed to 26 March 2013 from its originally scheduled date of 25 March 2013 due to inclement weather developing near its targeted splashdown site in the Pacific Ocean. The additional day spent attached to the orbiting laboratory did not affect science samples scheduled to return aboard the spacecraft.

On 26 March 2013, Dragon was unberthed from the Harmony node by the Canadarm2 at 08:10 UTC by commands from ground controllers. Its release from Canadarm2 occurred at 10:56 UTC; the Expedition 35 crew then commanded the spacecraft to slowly depart from the International Space Station. The SpaceX Dragon fired its engines for the last time at 15:42 UTC sending it through the atmosphere of Earth for a splashdown in the Pacific Ocean at 16:34 UTC. A team of SpaceX engineers, technicians and divers recovered the vehicle and its scientific cargo off the coast of Baja California, for the journey back to shore which took about 30 hours.

See also 

 List of Falcon 9 launches

References

External links 

 NASA's SpaceX mission page
 SpaceX CRS-2 Mission Press Kit (February 2013)
 Video of Static Fire test - YouTube (spacexchannel)
 Video of pre-launch press conference - YouTube (ReelNASA)
 Video of launch  - YouTube (ReelNASA)
 Video of Dragon arriving at the ISS  - YouTube (ReelNASA)
 Video of Dragon leaving the ISS  - YouTube (ReelNASA)
 Video of the Dragon capsule arriving at shore and other post-flight activities - YouTube (NASAtelevision)

SpaceX Dragon
Spacecraft launched in 2013
Spacecraft which reentered in 2013
SpaceX payloads contracted by NASA
Supply vehicles for the International Space Station